Michael McFarland may refer to:

 Michael C. McFarland (born 1948), president of the College of the Holy Cross in Worcester, Massachusetts
 Mike McFarland (born 1970), American voice actor

See also
Michael McFarlane (disambiguation)